Emoto is a Japanese surname and may refer to:

 Akira Emoto (born 1948), Japanese actor
 Ayao Emoto (1895–1978), Japanese photographer
 Masaru Emoto (1943–2014), Japanese author
 Naho Emoto (born 1985), Japanese softball player
 Tasuku Emoto (born 1986), Japanese actor
 Yuko Emoto (born 1972), Japanese judoka

Japanese-language surnames